Nanchital is a municipality in Veracruz, Mexico. It is about 438 km from the state capital, Xalapa. It has an area of 63.99 km2.

The municipality of Nanchital is delimited to the north by Coatzacoalcos to the south by Minatitlán and Moloacán.

It produces principally maize, beans, and rice.

Every December is the celebration in honor of San Nicolás de Baré, town patron.

The weather in Nanchital is warm all year with rains in summer and autumn. The town was the inspiration for "El apagón" ('the black out'), a song by the Mexican pop culture idol Yuri. It makes reference to the frequent black outs in the city.

References

External links 

  Municipal Official webpage
  Municipal Official Information

Municipalities of Veracruz